Andrew MacLeish (26 June 1838 – 14 January 1928) was a Scottish and American businessman.

Life and career
MacLeish was born in Glasgow, Scotland, to Agnes (Lindsay) and Archibald MacLeish. He received his education at the Glasgow Normal Academy, Hardy's English Academy and Flint's Commercial Academy. He worked in Glasgow and London in 1855 and 1856. That same year he immigrated to the United States, settling in Chicago. He spent six years as an employee of J. D. Sherman and J. G. Shay and was a member of J. B. Shay & Co. from 1864 to 1866. In 1867 he joined Carson, Pirie Scott & Co. and established the firm's retail department store. Along with John D. Rockefeller, MacLeish was a co-founder of the University of Chicago. He remained head of the store until his death in 1928. Archibald MacLeish, in writing of his father, said: “My father came from a very old country in the north and far away, and he belonged to an old strange race, the race older than any other. He did not talk of his country but he sang bits of old songs with words that he said no one could understand anymore.”

MacLeish died in Glencoe.

His third wife was Martha Hillard. She was a daughter of Rev. Elias Brewster Hillard and Julia Whittlesey. A graduate of Vassar College, she was a college professor and had served as president of Rockford College, and was influenced by the writings of Milicent Washburn Shinn. Their son, Archibald became Librarian of Congress. Another son, Kenneth, was an officer in the United States Navy during World War I.  A Naval aviator, he received the Navy Cross posthumously for his combat actions. MacLeish's great-grandson by his second wife is Bruce MacLeish Dern, (b. 1936), an American film actor, and his great-great-granddaughter is actress Laura Elizabeth Dern.

Further reading
Addams, Jane. My friend, Julia Lathrop. Campaign-Urbana: University of Illinois Press, 2004. 
James, Edward T. Notable American Women, 1607–1950 : A Biographical Dictionary. Cambridge. Publisher: Harvard University Press, 1971 
Lisle, Laurie. Westover: Giving Girls a Place of Their Own. Middletown: Wesleyan University Press, 2009.

References

1838 births
1928 deaths
American businesspeople
Businesspeople from Glasgow
University of Chicago people
British emigrants to the United States
Dern family